Cyclone Apollo, also known as Medicane Nearchus, was a powerful Mediterranean tropical-like cyclone that affected many countries on the Mediterranean coast, especially Italy, in 2021. The storm killed 7 people total, due to flooding from the cyclone, in the countries of Tunisia, Algeria, Malta, and Italy, where the worst of the effects have been felt, especially on the island of Sicily. Damage estimates by the Aon Benfield were set at more than $245 million.

Meteorological history
Around 22 October 2021, an area of organized thunderstorms formed near the Balearic Islands, with the disturbance becoming more organized and developing an area of low pressure around 24 October. On the next day, the low started to develop a low-level circulation center, and moved into the Tyrrhenian Sea. On 28 October, the system organized even further and intensified, which prompted forecast offices in Europe to name the low. Italy's "Servizio Meteorologico" named the storm Apollo (which was then adopted by the Free University of Berlin), while Greece named the storm Nearchus. After Apollo made its closest approach to Sicily during the overnight hours of 29 October, Apollo appeared to have begun to weaken as its convection waned and its low-level circulation became exposed on visible satellite imagery on 30 October 2021. On 31 October 2021, Apollo made landfall near Bayda and stayed inland until emerging over the Mediterranean a few hours later. On 2 November 2021, Apollo dissipated inland over Turkey.

Preparations and impact
Heavy rain from the cyclone and its precursor caused heavy rainfall and flooding in Tunisia, Algeria, Southern Italy, and Malta, killing 7 people total. The flooding was especially severe in the provinces of Catania and Siracusa, in Eastern Sicily.

Aftermath and naming
Some names for the cyclone include the most commonly-used one, Apollo, which was used by Italy, which used it from its naming list for the 2021-22 windstorm season, and was also used by the Free University of Berlin. The agency Meteo Greece named the system Nearchus, after the voyager of the same name.

See also

Mediterranean tropical-like cyclone
Tropical cyclones in 2021
Tropical cyclones and climate change
Cyclone Ianos – A powerful Medicane which effected similar areas a year prior
Cyclone Zorbas – Another powerful medicane which also developed in the same region in 2018

References

External links

2021 meteorology
2021 in Italy
Mediterranean tropical-like cyclones
October 2021 events in Europe
Apollo
2021 disasters in Europe